<onlyinclude>

June 2022

See also

References

killings by law enforcement officers
 06